They Call Me Bruce? (also known as They Call Me Bruce) is a 1982 American action comedy film directed by Elliott Hong, written by David B. Randolph and starring Johnny Yune and Margaux Hemingway.

The film was followed by a sequel, They Still Call Me Bruce (1987), which also starred Johnny Yune.

Plot
The film opens with a young boy running to meet his grandfather (played by Yune), who lies dying on his bed. The young boy sadly explains that he could not find the medicine required to cure his grandfather's ailment and wonders aloud who will take care of him after his grandfather dies. His dying grandfather attempts to reassure the young boy and explains that he should go to America. He further explains that when he was younger and working as a merchant marine, he met "the most beautiful girl" in America and tells the young boy that if he goes there, she will take very good care of him. As the young boy is asking how to find her, his grandfather dies and the film fades to black.

When it fades back in, quite some time has passed and the young boy, who is now an adult, has arrived in America and has begun working as a chef, catering to some gangsters in California. The gangsters, who call the man "Bruce" due to his resemblance to the famed martial artist Bruce Lee, are having trouble keeping their "boss of bosses" happy and are trying to come up with the perfect solution to distributing cocaine to all of their clients throughout the United States. Some previous attempts at moving the drug have resulted in busts and the boss of bosses is not happy.

Through a series of misunderstandings, Bruce makes it into the local newspaper as a hero, having thwarted an attempted robbery at the local market. Bruce's boss, Lil' Pete, sees the newspaper and quickly devises a plan, putting Bruce in control of moving the cocaine across the country and using Freddy, a stooge associated with the drug lords, as Bruce's limousine chauffeur. He convinces Bruce (who already wants to go to New York City to find the lady of whom his grandfather spoke) that he should drive to New York, not fly, as flying would rob him of seeing the beautiful countryside. Bruce agrees, and the rest of the film follows an unknowing Bruce delivering what he thinks to be Chinese flour to associates of the gangsters across the country, and the interactions he has with the people on this trip.

Cast

Releases
The film was given a limited release theatrically in the United States by Film Ventures International and Canada in November 1982. Despite never being in more than 325 theaters, the film was a surprise success and grossed $16,894,678 at the box office.

Home video
A DVD of the film was released on April 29, 2003 by Madacy Entertainment, with some minor changes. Various scenes were cut, one of which was the removal of a short scene of nudity involving a woman disrobing while Bruce is in a hot tub.

A 25th-Anniversary DVD edition of They Call Me Bruce? was released on June 30, 2009, by Liberation Entertainment. The film is a high-quality transfer from a newly discovered 35 mm print, which the studio calls "pristine", and also restores the scenes that were cut from the original DVD release.

References

External links

1982 films
1982 martial arts films
1980s action comedy films
1980s parody films
American action comedy films
Films set in California
Films about immigration to the United States
Immigration in fiction
Films about Chinese Americans
Films about Korean Americans
Cultural depictions of Bruce Lee
Action films about Asian Americans
1982 comedy films
1980s English-language films
1980s American films